The Austin Film Critics Association (AFCA) is an organization of professional film critics from Austin, Texas.

Each year, the AFCA votes on their end-of-year awards for films released in the same calendar year. A special award, the Austin Film Award, is given each year to the best film made in Austin or by an Austin-area director.

History
The Austin Film Critics Association was founded in 2005 by local film critics Cole Dabney and Robert "Bobby" McCurdy while attending Bowie High School in Austin. The organization grew in its first eight years, expanding from three members in 2005 to 25 members in 2013.

On January 12, 2007, after only one year in existence, Entertainment Weekly called the AFCA "wildly contrarian" for naming Elliot Page Best Actress for his role in Hard Candy over Helen Mirren for his performance in The Queen, as Mirren had swept the category so far during the award season.

The association chose to name the group's Breakthrough Artist Award to honor Robert "Bobby" McCurdy starting in 2010. McCurdy died on December 19, 2010, while training to become a Naval Aviator.

Categories
 Best Film
 Best Director
 Best Actor
 Best Actress
 Best Supporting Actor
 Best Supporting Actress
 Best Original Screenplay
 Best Adapted Screenplay
 Best Film Editing
 Best Ensemble
 Best Animated Film
 Best Foreign Language Film
 Best First Film
 Best Documentary
 Best Cinematography
 Best Score
 Best Stunts
 Best Motion Capture/Special Effects Performance
 The Robert R. "Bobby" McCurdy Memorial Breakthrough Artist Award
 Austin Film Award
 Special Honorary Award

Ceremonies
 2005
 2006
 2007
 2008
 2009
 2010
 2011
 2012
 2013
 2014
 2015
 2016
 2017
 2018
 2019
 2020
 2021
 2022

Winners
 † = Winner of the Academy Award

Best Picture

Best Director

Best Actor

Best Actress

Best Supporting Actor

Best Supporting Actress

Multiple award winners

Films
 9 awards:
 Everything Everywhere All At Once (2022): Best Film, Best Director, Best Actress, Best Supporting Actor, Best Supporting Actress, Best Original Screenplay,  Best Cinematography, Best Editing, Best Ensemble
 5 awards:
 There Will Be Blood (2007): Best Film, Best Director, Best Actor, Best Cinematography, Best Original Score
 The Dark Knight (2008): Best Film, Best Director, Best Supporting Actor, Best Original Score, Best Adapted Screenplay
 Black Swan (2010): Best Film, Best Director, Best Actress, Best Original Screenplay, Best Cinematography
 If Beale Street Could Talk (2018): Best Film, Best Director, Best Adapted Screenplay, Best Supporting Actor, Breakthrough Artist Award
 The Power of the Dog (2021): Best Film, Best Director, Best Supporting Actor, Best Supporting Actress, Best Original Score
 4 awards:
 Juno (2007): Best Actress, Best Supporting Actress, Best Original Screenplay, Breakthrough Artist Award
 Take Shelter (2011): Best Actor, Best Supporting Actress, Austin Film Award, Breakthrough Artist Award*
 Boyhood (2014): Best Film, Best Director, Best Supporting Actress, Austin Film Award
 Moonlight (2016): Best Film, Best Director, Best Supporting Actor, Best Original Screenplay
 Parasite (2019): Best Film, Best Director, Best Original Screenplay, Best Foreign Language Film
 3 awards
 The Hurt Locker (2009): Best Film, Best Director, Best Cinematography
 Inglourious Basterds (2009): Best Actress, Best Supporting Actor, Best Original Screenplay
 The Master (2012): Best Director, Best Actor, Best Cinematography
 12 Years a Slave (2013): Best Actor, Best Supporting Actress, Best Adapted Screenplay
 Her (2013): Best Film, Best Original Screenplay, Best Original Score
 Nightcrawler (2014): Best Actor, Best Original Screenplay, Best First Film
 Room (2015): Best Actress, Best Adapted Screenplay, Breakthrough Artist Award
 Tower (2016): Best Documentary, Austin Film Award, Breakthrough Artist Award
 Get Out (2017): Best Film, Best Original Screenplay, Best First Film
 Call Me by Your Name (2017): Best Actor, Best Adapted Screenplay, Breakthrough Artist Award
 Pig (2021): Best Actor, Best Original Screenplay, Best First Film

Producers, directors, and cinematographers
6 awards

Barry Jenkins
 Best Film
 2016 – Moonlight
 2018 – If Beale Street Could Talk
 Best Director
 2016 – Moonlight
 2018 – If Beale Street Could Talk
 Best Adapted Screenplay
 2018 – If Beale Street Could Talk
Best Original Screenplay
 2016 – Moonlight

Richard Linklater
 Best Film
 2014 – Boyhood
 Best Director
 2014 – Boyhood
 Best Austin Film
 2006 – A Scanner Darkly
 2009 – Me and Orson Welles
 2012 – Bernie
 2014 – Boyhood

4 awards

Alfonso Cuarón
 Best Director
 2006 – Children of Men
 2013 – Gravity
 Best Adapted Screenplay
 2006 – Children of Men
 Best Cinematography
 2018 – Roma

Bong Joon-ho
 Best Film
 2019 - Parasite
 Best Director
 2019 - Parasite
 Best Original Screenplay
 2019 - Parasite
 Best Foreign Language Film
 2019 - Parasite

Emmanuel Lubezki
 Best Cinematography
 2006 – Babel
 2011 – The Tree of Life
 2013 – Gravity
 2014 – Birdman or (The Unexpected Virtue of Ignorance)

Keith Maitland
 Best Documentary
 2016 – Tower
 Bobby McCurdy Memorial Breakthrough Artist Award
 2016 – Tower
 Austin Film Award
 2016 – Tower
 Special Honorary Award
 2016 – Tower

3 awards

Paul Thomas Anderson
 Best Film
 2007 – There Will Be Blood
 Best Director
 2007 – There Will Be Blood
 2012 – The Master

Kathryn Bigelow
 Best Film
 2009 – The Hurt Locker
 2012 – Zero Dark Thirty
 Best Director
 2009 – The Hurt Locker

Daniel Kwan and Daniel Scheinert
Best Film
 2022-Everything Everywhere All At Once
Best Director
 2022-Everything Everywhere All At Once
Best Original Screenplay
 2022-Everything Everywhere All At Once

Guillermo del Toro
 Best Director
 2017 – The Shape of Water
 Best Original Screenplay
 2006 – Pan's Labyrinth
 Best Foreign Film
 2006 – Pan's Labyrinth

Jordan Peele
 Best Film
 2017 – Get Out
 Best Original Screenplay
 2017 – Get Out
 Best First Film
 2017 – Get Out

Robert Rodriguez
 Best Austin Film
 2005 – Sin City
 2007 – Grindhouse (Shared with Quentin Tarantino)
 Best Animated Film
 2005 – Sin City

2 awards

Mark Boal
 Best Film
 2009 – The Hurt Locker
 2012 – Zero Dark Thirty

Megan Ellison
 Best Film
 2012 – Zero Dark Thirty
 2013 – Her

Paul Haggis
 Best Film
 2005 – Crash
 Best Director
 2005 – Crash

Rian Johnson
 Best First Film
 2006 – Brick
 Best Original Screenplay
 2012 – Looper

Quentin Tarantino
 Best Original Screenplay
 2009 – Inglourious Basterds
 Best Austin Film
 2007 – Grindhouse (Shared with Robert Rodriguez)

Actors
3 awards

Brie Larson
 Best Actress
 2013 – Short Term 12
 2015 – Room
 Bobby McCurdy Breakthrough Artist Award
 2013 – Short Term 12

2 awards

Timothée Chalamet
 Best Actor
 2017 – Call Me by Your Name
 Bobby McCurdy Breakthrough Artist Award
 2017 – for his work in Call Me By your Name, and Lady Bird

Jessica Chastain
 Best Supporting Actress
 2011 – Take Shelter
 Bobby McCurdy Breakthrough Artist Award
 2011 – for her work in The Debt, The Help, Take Shelter, and The Tree of Life

Colin Firth
 Best Actor
 2009 – A Single Man
 2010 – The King's Speech

Anne Hathaway
 Best Actress
 2008 – Rachel Getting Married
 Best Supporting Actress
 2017 – Les Misérables

Allison Janney
 Best Supporting Actress
 2007 – Juno
 2017 – I, Tonya

Elliot Page 
 Best Actress
 2006 – Hard Candy
 2007 – Juno

Christoph Waltz
 Best Supporting Actor
 2008 – Inglourious Basterds
 2012 – Django Unchained

Top 10 Films of the Decade (2000s)
 Eternal Sunshine of the Spotless Mind (2004)
 There Will Be Blood (2007)
 The Lord of the Rings (2001–2003)
 The Dark Knight (2008)
 Requiem for a Dream (2000)
 Kill Bill (2003/4)
 No Country for Old Men (2007)
 The Incredibles (2004)
 Children of Men (2006)
 Memento (2000) / The Departed (2006) (TIE)

Top 10 Films of the Decade (2010s)
 Mad Max Fury Road (2015)
 Moonlight (2016)
 The Social Network (2010)
 Get Out (2017)
 Arrival (2016)
 The Handmaiden (2016)
 Parasite (2019)
 Once Upon a Time in Hollywood (2019)
 Boyhood (2014)
 Phantom Thread (2017)

Notes

 A: Elliot Page won before his gender transition in 2020.

References

External links
 Official 'Austin Film Critics Association website

 
American film critics associations
Cinema of Texas
Culture of Austin, Texas
Mass media in Austin, Texas
Organizations based in Austin, Texas
Organizations established in 2005
2005 establishments in Texas